Freeland may refer to:

Places

Canada
Freeland, Prince Edward Island

United Kingdom
Freeland, Oxfordshire

United States
Freeland, Maryland
Freeland, Michigan 
Freeland, Ohio
Freeland, Pennsylvania
Freeland, Washington

Other uses
Freeland (surname)
Freeland, the English title of the Utopian 1890 novel Freiland by Theodor Hertzka
Freeland, a 2020 film directed by Mario Furloni and Kate McLean
Freeland, the attributed artist name of Adam Freeland, an English musician and producer
Freeland, a city where the 2018 CW series Black Lightning takes place
Virtual State of Freeland, a virtual state in the Russian animated web series Mr. Freeman
Freeland Foundation, an international NGO concerned with environmental conservation and human rights

See also
 Free Land (disambiguation)
 Freedland